Nathan Hale State Forest is a Connecticut state forest encompassing  in the towns of Coventry and Andover. The forest is managed to sustain a reliable source of forest products and renewable habitat for wildlife. The forest originated in 1946 through the bequest of George Dudley Seymour, which allowed the state to purchase 850 acres in the surrounds of the historic Nathan Hale Homestead. In addition to cultivated plantations, the forest includes a 200-acre natural area that is kept without management activity. A   parcel, Creaser Park, is leased to the Town of Coventry for recreational use. The park offers hiking trails, fishing, and a dog-friendly area. Recreational usage in the rest of the forest includes hiking, hunting and letterboxing.

References

External links
Nathan Hale State Forest Connecticut Department of Energy and Environmental Protection

Connecticut state forests
Parks in Tolland County, Connecticut
Coventry, Connecticut
Protected areas established in 1946
1946 establishments in Connecticut